The 1938–39 Greek Football Cup was the third edition of the Greek Football Cup. The competition culminated with the Greek Cup Final, held at Leoforos Alexandras Stadium, on 28 May 1939. The match was contested by AEK Athens and PAOK, with AEK Athens winning by 2–1.

Calendar

Qualification round

First round

|-
|colspan="5" style="background-color:#D0D0D0" align=center|Athens Football Clubs Association
||colspan="2" rowspan="9" 

|-
|colspan="5" style="background-color:#D0D0D0" align=center|Piraeus Football Clubs Association
||colspan="2" rowspan="7" 

|-
|colspan="5" style="background-color:#D0D0D0" align=center|Macedonia Football Clubs Association
||colspan="2" rowspan="4" 

|-
|colspan="5" style="background-color:#D0D0D0" align=center|Thrace Football Clubs Association

||colspan="2" 
|-
|colspan="5" style="background-color:#D0D0D0" align=center|Central-Eastern Macedonia Football Clubs Association
||colspan="2" rowspan="6" 

|-
|colspan="5" style="background-color:#D0D0D0" align=center|Thessaly Football Clubs Association
||colspan="2" rowspan="4" 

|-
|colspan="5" style="background-color:#D0D0D0" align=center|Patras Football Clubs Association
||colspan="2" rowspan="4" 

|-
|colspan="5" style="background-color:#D0D0D0" align=center|Crete Football Clubs Association
||colspan="2" rowspan="3" 

|}

Second round

|-
|colspan="5" style="background-color:#D0D0D0" align=center|Athens Football Clubs Association
||colspan="2" rowspan="5" 

|-
|colspan="5" style="background-color:#D0D0D0" align=center|Piraeus Football Clubs Association
||colspan="2" rowspan="4" 

|-
|colspan="5" style="background-color:#D0D0D0" align=center|Macedonia Football Clubs Association
||colspan="2" rowspan="2" 

|-
|colspan="5" style="background-color:#D0D0D0" align=center|Thrace Football Clubs Association
||colspan="2" 
|-
|colspan="5" style="background-color:#D0D0D0" align=center|Central-Eastern Macedonia Football Clubs Association
||colspan="2" rowspan="2" 

|-
|colspan="5" style="background-color:#D0D0D0" align=center|Thessaly Football Clubs Association
||colspan="2" rowspan="2" 

|-
|colspan="5" style="background-color:#D0D0D0" align=center|Patras Football Clubs Association
||colspan="2" rowspan="2" 

|-
|colspan="5" style="background-color:#D0D0D0" align=center|Crete Football Clubs Association
||colspan="2" rowspan="2" 

|}

Third round

|-
|colspan="5" style="background-color:#D0D0D0" align=center|Athens Football Clubs Association
||colspan="2" rowspan="3" 

|-
|colspan="5" style="background-color:#D0D0D0" align=center|Piraeus Football Clubs Association

||colspan="2" 
|-
|colspan="5" style="background-color:#D0D0D0" align=center|Macedonia Football Clubs Association
||colspan="2" 
|-
|colspan="5" style="background-color:#D0D0D0" align=center|Thrace/Central-Eastern Macedonia Football Clubs Association
||colspan="2" rowspan="3" 

|-
|colspan="5" style="background-color:#D0D0D0" align=center|Thessaly Football Clubs Association
||colspan="2" 
|-
|colspan="5" style="background-color:#D0D0D0" align=center|Patras Football Clubs Association
||colspan="2" 
|-
|colspan="5" style="background-color:#D0D0D0" align=center|Crete Football Clubs Association
||colspan="2" 
|}

Fourth round

|-
|colspan="3" style="background-color:#D0D0D0" align=center|Athens Football Clubs Association

|-
|colspan="3" style="background-color:#D0D0D0" align=center|Piraeus Football Clubs Association

|-
|colspan="3" style="background-color:#D0D0D0" align=center|Thrace/Central-Eastern Macedonia Football Clubs Association

|}

Fifth round

|-
|colspan="3" style="background-color:#D0D0D0" align=center|Athens Football Clubs Association

|}

Knockout phase
In the knockout phase, teams play against each other over a single match. If the match ends up as a draw, extra time will be played and if the match remains a draw a replay match is set at the home of the guest team which the extra time rule stands as well. That procedure will be repeated until a winner occurs. The mechanism of the draws for each round is as follows:
In the draw for the round of 16, the eight top teams of each association are seeded and the eight clubs that passed the qualification round are unseeded.The seeded teams are drawn against the unseeded teams.
In the draws for the quarter-finals onwards, there are no seedings, and teams from the same group can be drawn against each other.

Bracket

Round of 16

|}

Quarter-finals

|}

Semi-finals

|}

*Match suspended at 40th minute while the score was 1–2. Awarded 0–2 to AEK Athens.

Final

The 3rd Greek Cup Final was played at the Leoforos Alexandras Stadium.

References

External links
Greek Cup 1938-39 at RSSSF

Greek Football Cup seasons
Greek Cup
1938–39 in Greek football